Martinez Lake is a lake in the southwestern corner of the U.S. state of Arizona, about 60 miles north of Yuma, Arizona on the Lower Colorado River.

Fish species
 Largemouth Bass
 Smallmouth Bass
 Striped Bass
 Crappie
 Bullhead
 Catfish (Channel)
 Catfish (Flathead)
 Tilapia
 Redear Sunfish
 Green Sunfish
 Bluegill Sunfish
 Carp
 Bullfrogs

General information
 Average Depth: 1–10 ft
 Elevation: 200 ft

External links
 Martinez lake
 Martinez lake Resort
 Arizona Boating Locations Facilities Map
 Arizona Fishing Locations Map

Lakes of Yuma County, Arizona
Lakes of Arizona